Kaddour Beldjilali (born November 28, 1988) is an Algerian footballer who plays as a attacking midfielder.

Club career
Beldjilali started his career in the youth ranks of MC Oran before moving to USM Blida and then JS Saoura.

After three seasons with JS Saoura, Beldjilali joined Tunisian club Étoile du Sahel, with the Tunisians paying a transfer fee of €360,000.
In 2020, Beldjilali signed a contract with ASO Chlef.

On 15 June 2022, Beldjilali joined Al-Sadd.

International career
In May 2013, Beldjilali was called up to the Algeria A' national football team for the first time for a friendly match against Mauritania. He made his international debut as a starter in the match, which Algeria won 1–0, before being substituted off at half-time.

Honours
With USM Alger:
 Algerian Ligue Professionnelle 1 (1): 2015-16
 Algerian Super Cup (1): 2016

References

External links

 
 

1988 births
Living people
Algerian footballers
Footballers from Oran
Algeria A' international footballers
Association football midfielders
MC Oran players
CR Témouchent players
USM Blida players
JS Saoura players
Étoile Sportive du Sahel players
USM Alger players
CS Constantine players
ASO Chlef players
Bisha FC players
Al-Arabi SC (Saudi Arabia) players
Al-Sadd FC (Saudi football club) players
Algerian Ligue Professionnelle 1 players
Algerian Ligue 2 players
Tunisian Ligue Professionnelle 1 players
Saudi First Division League players
Saudi Second Division players
Algerian expatriate footballers
Expatriate footballers in Tunisia
Algerian expatriate sportspeople in Tunisia
Expatriate footballers in Saudi Arabia
Algerian expatriate sportspeople in Saudi Arabia
21st-century Algerian people